Colors Cineplex (formerly Rishtey Cineplex from 2016 to 2019 in SD and the HD version formerly known as Cineplex HD from 2017–19) is an Indian pay television channel owned by Viacom18. It was launched on 29 March 2016.

History
In June 2016 Viacom18 decided to launch the channel in the UK as Rishtey Cineplex. It launched on 29 September 2016 on Sky, replacing UMP Movies.

The channel was launched on Freeview on 17 January 2017. However, it was later removed on 1 July 2017.

In 2017, Viacom18 launched HD movie channel Cineplex HD and it was rebranded as Colors Cineplex HD in 2019.

In October 2017, the channel was launched in Virgin Media.

On 1 March 2019, Rishtey Cineplex was rebranded as Colors Cineplex and Cineplex HD as Colors Cineplex HD.

Viacom18 relaunched Rishtey Cineplex on 5 June 2020 on DD Free Dish. Viacom18 launched another Hindi movie channel Colors Cineplex Bollywood on 1 April 2021. The channel broadcasts Bollywood and the hindi dubbed South Indian movies.

Original shows
 Road Safety World Series is a T20 cricket competition organised by the Road Safety Cell of Maharashtra to raise awareness about road safety. In the Road safety world series, Cricket world Legends will match against each other for a noble cause. It will be a series of 11 matches that will be played in the T20 format. The series features some big names in cricket from India, Australia, Sri Lanka, West Indies and South Africa like Sachin Tendulkar, Virender Sehwag, Yuvraj Singh, Zaheer Khan, Brian Lara, Shivnarine Chanderpaul, etc. and Former India captain Sunil Gavaskar is the commissioner of the series. The series was aired from 7 to 22 March 2020 on Colors Cineplex. Ravi Gaikwad, Chief of RTO, Thane (Konkan Range), Government of Maharashtra, is the founder of the Road Safety World Series, who integrated concept of Road Safety with sports to save lives on Indian roads and across the globe.

The man who has been supporting for the cause of road safety is Ravi Gaikwad, Senior Member of Road Safety Cell, Government of Maharashtra.

Ravi Gaikwad, Chairman of Shant Bharat Surakshit Bharat appreciated Yohan Blake's visit to India and his efforts for road safety campaign, which required the need to educate the people and make them aware of their responsibilities so as to save as many lives as possible on Indian roads.

 T10 League – Abu Dhabi T10 League season 5 was broadcast on the channel along with Rishtey Cineplex and Voot.

References

Television stations in Mumbai
Hindi-language television stations
Hindi-language television channels in India
Television channels and stations established in 2016
Viacom 18
Movie channels in India
2016 establishments in Maharashtra